Granger High School is a public high school located in Granger, Washington. It serves 432 students in grades 9 through 12. 90% of the students are Hispanic, while 5% are American Indian, 4% are White, and 1% are two or more races.

Mike Carlson has served as Granger High School Principal since 2018.

The main school classrooms were completed in 1965. An addition of four classrooms and a gymnasium was started in 2015 and opened to the public in the spring of 2017.

The Granger High School mascot is the Spartan.

External links 
 https://hs.gsd.wednet.edu/.

References

Public high schools in Washington (state)
High schools in Yakima County, Washington